Lucia Basson (born 20 March 1953 in Karasburg, ǁKaras Region) is a Namibian politician who has been the governor of the ǁKaras Region of Namibia from April 2015 to April 2020. A member of SWAPO, Basson was a member of the National Assembly of Namibia from being chosen for the SWAPO electoral list by President Sam Nujoma in 2005 until 2010, when she narrowly missed re-election. She is a SWAPO leader from the Hardap Region.

References

1953 births
Living people
People from ǁKaras Region
People from Hardap Region
Members of the National Assembly (Namibia)
SWAPO politicians
21st-century Namibian women politicians
21st-century Namibian politicians
Women members of the National Assembly (Namibia)